Bahía Posesión, also known in English as Possession Bay, is an ocean bay on the north shore of the Strait of Magellan located between Primera Angostura and Punta Dúngeness.

In 1974, the oil tanker VLCC Metula, en route to Quintero Bay, Chile, ran aground here and lost some 60,000 tons of light Arabian crude before reflotation, severely affecting the local wildlife.

See also
 Tierra del Fuego

Notes

References
 Roy W. Harm, Jr. Metula Oil Spill , U.S. Coast Guard Report, 1974.
 C. Michael Hogan,  Pali Aike, The Megalithic Portal, ed. A. Burnham, 2008.

Strait of Magellan
Bays of Chile
Bodies of water of Magallanes Region